Tinta Amarela or Trincadeira is a red wine grape that is commonly used in Port wine production. The grape is noted for its dark coloring. Its use in the Douro region has been increasing in recent years. The vine is susceptible to rot and performs better in dry, hot climates.

It is one of the most widely planted grape varieties in Portugal.  It is the oldest and most widely planted grape variety in the Alentejo region, where it is called Trincadeira. The wine tends to be full-bodied and rich, with aromas of blackberries, herbs and flowers.

See also
List of Port wine grapes
List of Portuguese grape varieties

References

Red wine grape varieties